Maria Bagnesi (15 August 1514 - 28 May 1577) was an Italian Roman Catholic professed member of the Third Order of Saint Dominic. Bagnesi remained confined to her bed for most of her life after falling ill upon receiving news that her father arranged a marriage for her - she escaped this fate but remained in her room where people flocked to seek her counsel. Due to her devotion to Bartholomew the Apostle she assumed the name of "Bartolomea" and added it to her name as a sort of middle name.

The confirmation of the late Bagnesi's longstanding local 'cultus' (or popular devotion) allowed for Pope Pius VII to approve her beatification in 1804.

Life
Maria Bagnesi was born in Florence on 15 August 1514 - the Feast of the Assumption - to Carlo Bagnesi and Alessandra Orlandini. Bagnesi was a neglected child and her mother often left her in the care of others which included one of Bagnesi's sisters who was a nun from the Order of Preachers so she spent most of her childhood in her sister's convent. Four of her sisters would end up in the religious life.

Her father organized a marriage for her when she turned seventeen and she fainted in horror upon learning this. The thought made Bagnesi so ill she could not walk and was thus confined to her bed. Her father turned to con men and charlatans - for he could be manipulated with ease - and put his daughter through over three decades of non-stop "treatment". Being bedridden meant that she could not follow her sisters into the religious life but she nevertheless became a member of the Third Order of Saint Dominic in 1544 and made her profession in 1545; she made her profession into the hands of and received the habit from Vittorio di Mattheo who allowed for this to take place in Bagnesi's room. After she professed she found that she could get out of her bed for brief periods of time. The combination of asthma and these quack treatments immobilized her just as she began to heal and she started to have visions and converse with angels and demons alike. Neighbors began to believe she was under demonic possession and summoned a local priest - who became her spiritual advisor who assured the locals she was not possessed or in need of an exorcism. People also claimed to have seen her levitate. She was also granted the special privilege of having Mass celebrated in her room at times.

Her room soon became a place for pilgrims to go to in order to seek her wisdom and counsel and her room became a place for cats to roam - some remained with her and even slept on her bed while guarding her pet songbirds. Bagnesi developed a deep devotion to Saint Bartholomew the Apostle and she assumed the name of "Bartolomea" as part of her actual name as a sort of middle name. She also came to know Saint Maria Maddalena de' Pazzi and shared her visions with her; the saint would herself be cured due to Bagnesi's intercession on 16 June 1584. Bagnesi received the Eucharist three to six times a week and prepared beforehand with docile care and spent the time following her reception of it in deep reflection. Her confessors were the priests Alessandro Capocchi and Agostino Campi.

Bagnesi died in Florence in 1577 and at the end of her life five priests present at her deathbed read to her one of the Gospel accounts of the Passion of Jesus Christ. Her remains were taken in procession for her funeral from Santa Maria Novella to Santa Maria degli Angeli where she was interred. Her remains were putatively incorrupt.

Beatification

Ferdinando Bagnesi, a descendant of Maria, sought to promote his illustrious ancestor for sainthood by writing a biography, probably motivated by the social prestige this would bring. The process was partially successful about 60 years later, when Maria Bagnesi's local 'cultus' (or popular devotion) received confirmation on 11 July 1804, allowing for Pope Pius VII to approve her beatification. Her liturgical feast is celebrated on an annual basis on the date of her death - or her 'dies natalis' (birth into heaven).

References

External links
Saints SQPN

1514 births
1577 deaths
16th-century Italian Roman Catholic religious sisters and nuns
Dominican beatified people
Dominican tertiaries
Italian Dominicans
Lay Dominicans
Italian beatified people
Members of the Dominican Order
Religious leaders from Florence
Third Order of Saint Dominic
Beatifications by Pope Pius VII